The 1930–31 League of Ireland was the tenth season of the League of Ireland. Bohemians were the defending champions.

Shelbourne won their third title.

Overview
Two new teams were elected to the League: Dolphin and Waterford. 

Fordsons changed their name to Cork. Dundalk dropped their 'G.N.R.' moniker.

Teams

Table

Results

Top goalscorers

See also 

 1930–31 FAI Cup

Ireland
Lea
League of Ireland seasons